Constance Debré, born in 1972, is a French lawyer and novelist.

Biography
Constance Debré's parents were journalist François Debré (1942–2020) and former model Maylis Ybarnégaray (1942–1988); the judge and politician Jean-Louis Debré is her uncle. Her grandparents included Michel Debré (1912–1996), former Prime Minister under General de Gaulle, and Jean Ybarnégaray (1883–1956), a minister of the Vichy regime and resistance fighter.

She was 16 when her mother died. She studied at Lycée Henri-IV, then law at Panthéon-Assas University. She is also a graduate of class 99 (E99) of the ESSEC Business School. She married in 1993 and had a son in 2008. 

Working as a defence lawyer, she accompanied her father in 2011 when he was charged in an inquiry into fictitious jobs at the town hall of Paris. In 2013, she was elected second secretary of the Conference of Lawyers of the Paris Bar. 

In 2015, she left her husband and her job to live with a woman and pursue a full-time career as a writer. It formed the first book in a trilogy.

Books 
 Un peu là, beaucoup ailleurs, Monaco-Paris, France, Le Rocher, 2004, Prix Contrepoint, 2005
 Manuel pratique de l'idéal. Abécédaire de survie, Monaco-Paris, France, Le Rocher, 2007, 
 Play Boy, Paris, Éditions Stock, 2018, 
 Love me tender, Paris, Éditions Flammarion, 2020, 
Translated into English by Holly James, 2023, 
 Nom, Paris, Éditions Flammarion, 2022,

References 

Living people
1972 births
21st-century French novelists
French lesbian writers
21st-century French women lawyers
Lycée Henri-IV alumni
Paris 2 Panthéon-Assas University alumni
ESSEC Business School alumni